George Thomson Cornet (15 July 1877 – 22 April 1952) was the only Scot in the Great Britain and Ireland water polo team that won gold in the 1908 Summer Olympics and the 1912 Summer Olympics. He was born in Inverness and died in Rainhill.

He played as a back for the Inverness Amateurs team that won the Scottish Championship in 1909 and reached four other finals; Cornet represented Scotland a total of 17 times between 1897 and 1912.  Cornet also played football and cricket for Inverness teams as well as competing in heavy and track athletics events.

Cornet was inducted into the Scottish Sports Hall of Fame on 12 March 2007. He was first married to Barbara Mackintosh who died in childbirth, after which he married her sister Isabella Mackintosh with whom he had a daughter, Ruby.

See also
 Great Britain men's Olympic water polo team records and statistics
 List of Olympic champions in men's water polo
 List of Olympic medalists in water polo (men)

References

External links

 

1877 births
1952 deaths
Sportspeople from Inverness
Scottish male water polo players
Scottish footballers
Olympic water polo players of Great Britain
Olympic gold medallists for Great Britain
Olympic medalists in water polo
Water polo players at the 1908 Summer Olympics
Water polo players at the 1912 Summer Olympics
Scottish Olympic medallists
Medalists at the 1912 Summer Olympics
Medalists at the 1908 Summer Olympics
Association footballers not categorized by position